Raj Television Network is an Indian satellite television network established on 3 June 1994 and is based in Chennai, India. It owns television channels across four South Indian languages Tamil, Telugu, Kannada and Malayalam. Its flagship channel is Raj TV.
It also has one Hindi Language channel named Raj Pariwar.

In 1983, four brothers established a video cassette lending company named Raj Video Vision. In 1984, the group started acquiring rights for Tamil films. In 1987, Rajendra an integrated studio was opened by Raj group  and were used by independent movie and TV serial producers. The group used the studio to export 35 mm films and teleserials to Singapore, Malaysia, United Kingdom, UAE among others. Raj television network was established on 3 June 1994 with the launch of the Tamil channel Raj TV on 14 October 1994.

Owned Channels

Shut down channel

References

Television networks in India
Companies based in Chennai
1994 establishments in Tamil Nadu
Television channels and stations established in 1994
Companies listed on the National Stock Exchange of India
Companies listed on the Bombay Stock Exchange